The 1959–60 NBA season was the Nationals' 11th season in the NBA.

Regular season

Season standings

x – clinched playoff spot

Record vs. opponents

Game log

Playoffs

|- align="center" bgcolor="#ffcccc" 
| 1
| March 11
| @ Philadelphia
| L 92–115
| Dick Barnett (19)
| Barney Cable (13)
| Larry Costello (4)
| Philadelphia Civic Center
| 0–1
|- align="center" bgcolor="#ccffcc" 
| 2
| March 13
| Philadelphia
| W 125–119
| Dolph Schayes (40)
| Dolph Schayes (22)
| Larry Costello (9)
| Onondaga War Memorial
| 1–1
|- align="center" bgcolor="#ffcccc" 
| 3
| March 14
| @ Philadelphia
| L 112–132
| Dolph Schayes (31)
| Dolph Schayes (14)
| Larry Costello (7)
| Philadelphia Civic Center
| 1–2
|-

Awards and records
Dolph Schayes, All-NBA Second Team

References

Philadelphia 76ers seasons
Syracuse
1959 in sports in New York (state)
Syracuse